North-Caucasus Federal University, abbreviated as NCFU is a public university in Stavropol Krai, Russia with campuses in Stavropol and Pyatigorsk. It was established in 2012 as a flagship university of the newly created North Caucasian Federal District by merging Stavropol State University, North-Caucasus State Technical University, and Pyatigorsk State University of Humanities and Technology.

General information
North-Caucasus Federal University (NCFU) was established subject to a respective Decree by President of the Russian Federation (No. 958 of July 18, 2011) and an Order by the Government of the Russian Federation (No. 226-p of February 22, 2012) through a merger of three universities located in the Stavropol Region – North-Caucasus State Technical University, Stavropol State University and Pyatigorsk State University for Humanities & Technology.
The university comprises 9 institutes in Stavropol and 2 institutes (affiliates) in Pyatigorsk and Nevinnomyssk.
NCFU is currently running 156 higher education degree programs and specialties as well as over 700 professional development programs.

University rankings
NCFU is the only university in North-Caucasus Federal District to earn a place in the international rankings of QS Quacquarelli Sydmonds[1]. It is also rated among 40 top Russian universities (according to the National university ranking by Interfax).

Aims and objectives
NCFU aims and objectives are reflected in the strategic development program for 2012-2021 approved by the Government of the Russian Federation[6].
NCFU mission is to develop human and intellectual capital thus promoting competitive social and economic development in the areas of the Russian Federation that belong to North-Caucasus Federal District.
Subject  to the strategic development program, the university was established as a unique center for research, education and innovation-based sector of economy, supplying qualified staff for the focal areas of social and economic development; a leading expert platform for intercultural dialogue between the ethnically diverse regional community and the neighboring areas & countries; enhance inter-ethnic and inter-confessional communication; the key center of educational, scientific and cultural cooperation with national and international partners.

Special areas of development:
 industry, including nanosystems and nanomaterials, biomedicine and pharmaceutical technology, food biotechnology & food safety, mechanical engineering, oil and gas production technology;
 technological infrastructure, including energy efficiency, geoinformation technologies, information and telecommunication technologies, construction engineering and construction materials production, transport and logistics systems;
 recreation, including tourism, hospitality business, consumer service, ecology, biodiversity and rational environment management;
 social science and humanities, including technologies for ethno-cultural, ethno-social, ethno-demographic and ethno-political studies and intercultural communications.

Institutes

Institute of Humanities;
Institute of Engineering;
Institute of Mathematics and Natural Sciences;
Institute of Life Sciences;
Institute of Information Technologies and Telecommunications;
Institute of Oil and Gas;
Institute of Economics and Management;
Institute of Education and Social Sciences;
Institute of Law.

Affiliates
Institute of Technology (NCFU branch in Nevinnomyssk, Russia);
Institute of Service, Tourism and Design (NCFU branch in Pyatigorsk, Russia).

Major academic fields
 Information technologies
 Applied mathematics
 Information security
 Electronics
 Nanotechnologies
 Power energy
 Oil and gas
 Geosciences
 Ecology and environmental management
 Engineering
 Biology
 History
 Economy
 Management
 Tourism and hospitality
 Humanities
 Social sciences
 Law studies
 Pedagogy
 Psychology
 Physics
 Chemistry
 Linguistics
 Design

Major research fields
 organic chemistry, pharmaceutical chemistry;
 nanotechnologies and advanced materials;
 technologies of life science, food safety and food biotechnology;
 aerospace and geoinformation technologies, land-use planning;
 neurocomputers, parallel and high-performance computing;
 complex information security of infrastructure facilities;
 energy efficiency;
 ethnodemography, conflictolog studies;
 socio-political and humanitarian research and technology, the culture and traditions of the North-Caucasus ethnic groups.

Research is carried out at 27 research schools within 47 areas.
NCFU can boast of 10 scientific dissertation councils embracing 24 specialties.
The university library is one of the best in Russia with more than 1.5 million items, including a collection of old printed books and rare editions published in the XVII Century and later.
NCFU chemists have earned support from the Russian research foundation to carry out their projects focusing on the synthesis of substances helping eliminate various tumors,
Within the framework of the special Federal program RESEARCH IN MAIN FIELDS OF DEVELOPMENT FOR RUSSIAN SCIENCE AND TECHNOLOGY, 2014–2020, NCFU's researchers ran projects focusing on intelligent power metering systems, software and hardware, as well as unmanned aerial vehicles in special navigation systems.
NCFU's experts, supported by the Advanced Research Foundation, developed a technology for manufacturing laser-quality ceramics with a high degree of transparency and obtained cheap samples of working ceramic bodies that can be used in constructions of solid-state disk lasers with diode pumping.
NCFU's numerous advance projects allowed launching of the first Russian workshop for pharmacopoeial and alimental lactose production on the premises of the Stavropol Dairy Plant, JSC.
According to Russian rankings, NCFU is among the top thirty Russian universities that stand out in terms of research efficiency in the field of humanities and social issues.

International partners
The university has a number of relationships with universities in more than 40 countries. It has double degree programmes with Roma University La Sapienza (Italy), Technical University of Dresden (Germany). It is a member of European University Association.

In 2020, the North-Caucasus Federal University established the Great Caucasus format together with the Abkhazian State University, the National University of Architecture and Construction of Armenia and the South Ossetian State University. The four universities will work more together and spread the use of the Russian language.

Human capital
The university has an academic staff of around 1,500 members.
Student body – ab. 25,000. 
From 2017 on, following a respective order by the Russian Ministry of Science and Higher Education, a Resource Training Center for Persons with Disabilities has been functioning at NCFU, the purpose of the Center being to offer methodological support to academic institutions of the North Caucasus including in the field of inclusive education.
Alina Levitskaia – Rector, NCFU; 2012 to August, 2019.
Irina Vasilevna Soloveva – Acting Rector, NCFU; August – October, 2019.
November 2019 – Dmitry Bespalov was appointed as NCFU's Acting Rector.
Control over the university activity resides in a specially established Supervisory Board, where Vladimir Vladimirov, Governor of the Stavropol Region, is the head.

History 
 Stavropol Agropedagogic Institute (1930), thereafter:
 Stavropol State Pedagogic Institute (1932);
 Stavropol State Pedagogic University (1993);
 Stavropol State University (through integration with an affiliate of Moscow State Academy of Law) (1996);
 Stavropol Polytechnic Institute[24] (1971), thereafter:
 Stavropol State Technical University (1994);
 North-Caucasus State Technical University (1999);
 Pyatigorsk State University for Humanities & Technology (1999) (subject to the Decree by Prime Minister of the Russian Federation V.V. Putin; 
 On January 23, 2010, at a meeting held by Prime Minister of the Russian Federation in Pyatigorsk, North-Caucasus Federal University was officially announced as launched. 
 On July 18, 2011, President of the Russian Federation signed a Decree establishing North-Caucasus Federal University on the premises of North-Caucasus State Technical University (via affiliating other educational institutions).
 On February 22, 2012 North-Caucasus Federal University was officially declared established by a special Decree.

References

External links
 

 
Buildings and structures in Stavropol Krai
Stavropol
Federal universities of Russia